Jack Connolly was an actor who appeared in many silent films during the early 20th century. Despite a lengthy filmography, very little is known about Connolly or his personal life. He has been described as "a completely lost player who can only be identified by the movies he made." He had a lead role in the 1916 film The Mask of Fortune. He portrayed a wrongly convicted former prisoner working on a ranch in The Wolverine.

Filmography
Graft (1915 serial) as Ben Travers
The Mask of Fortune (1916)
The Decoy (1916 film)
The Silent Battle (1916 film) as James Loring
Cross Purposes (film) (1916)
A Jewel in Pawn (1917) as Bob Hendricks
The Mate of the Sally Ann (1917) as Judge Gordon
The Little Patriot (1917)
True Blue
The Egg Crate Wallop (1919)
The Lincoln Highwayman (1919) as Mack
The Little Diplomat (1919) as Trent Gordon
Shod with Fire (1920) as Tommy Clary
Woman's Place (1921)
Night Life in Hollywood (1922)
 The Broadway Madonna (1922)
 The Wolverine (1921)
The Mysterious Witness (1923)

References

Year of birth missing (living people)
Date of birth missing
Date of death missing
Silent film actors